Frederick County is located in the northern part of the U.S. state of Maryland. As of the 2020 U.S. census, the population was 	271,717. The county seat is Frederick.

Frederick County is part of the Washington-Arlington-Alexandria, DC-VA-MD-WV Metropolitan Statistical Area. Like other outlying sections of the Washington metropolitan area, Frederick County has experienced a rapid population increase in recent years. It borders the southern border of Pennsylvania and the northeastern border of Virginia.

Catoctin Mountain Park in the county is the location of Camp David, a U.S. presidential retreat, and Fort Detrick, a U.S. Army base.

Etymology
The namesake of Frederick County and its county seat is unknown, but it was probably either Frederick, Prince of Wales, or Frederick Calvert, 6th Baron Baltimore.

History
Frederick County was created in 1748 by the Province of Maryland from parts of Prince George's County and Baltimore County.

In 1776, following US independence, Frederick County was divided into three parts. The westernmost portion became Washington County, named after George Washington, the southernmost portion became Montgomery County, named after another Revolutionary War general, Richard Montgomery. The northern portion remained Frederick County.

In 1837, a part of Frederick County was combined with a part of Baltimore County to form Carroll County which is east of current day Frederick County.

The county has a number of properties on the National Register of Historic Places.

Geography

It is the largest county in Maryland in terms of land area.

Frederick County straddles the boundary between the Piedmont Plateau Region and the Appalachian Mountains. The county's two prominent ridges, Catoctin Mountain and South Mountain, form an extension of the Blue Ridge. The Middletown Valley lies between them.

Attractions in the Frederick area include the Clustered Spires, a monument to Francis Scott Key, the National Museum of Civil War Medicine, Monocacy National Battlefield and South Mountain battlefields, and the Schifferstadt Architectural Museum.

Adjacent counties
 Adams County, Pennsylvania (north)
 Carroll County (east)
 Franklin County, Pennsylvania (northwest)
 Montgomery County (south)
 Washington County (west)
 Loudoun County, Virginia (southwest)

National protected areas
 Catoctin Mountain Park
 Chesapeake and Ohio Canal National Historical Park (part)
 Monocacy National Battlefield

Major highways

Demographics

Frederick County has experienced a rapid increase in population in recent years, including that of minority groups.

2020 census

Note: the US Census treats Hispanic/Latino as an ethnic category. This table excludes Latinos from the racial categories and assigns them to a separate category. Hispanics/Latinos can be of any race.

2010 census
At the 2010 United States Census, there were 233,385 people, 84,800 households and 61,198 families residing in the county. The racial make-up of the county was 81.5% white, 8.6% black or African American, 3.8% Asian, 0.3% American Indian, 2.9% from other races and 2.8% from two or more races. The total (all races) of those self-identifying as Hispanic or Latino origin made up 7.3%, and those persons who were white alone made up 77.8% of the population. 26.3% of the population cited German ancestry, 17.4% Irish, 12.1% English, 7.2% Italian, and 6.3% American.

Of the 84,800 households, 37.6% had children under the age of 18 living with them, 57.8% were married couples living together, 10.0% had a female householder with no husband present, 27.8% were non-families, and 22.0% of all households were made up of individuals. The average household size was 2.70 and the average family size was 3.17. The median age was 38.6 years.

The median household income was $81,686 and the median family income was $95,036. Males had a median income of $62,494 and females $46,720. The per capita income was $35,172. About 3.2% of families and 4.8% of the population were below the poverty line, including 5.8% of those under age 18 and 5.6% of those age 65 or over.<ref"></ref>

Law, government, and politics

Charter government
On December 1, 2014, Frederick County changed to a "charter home rule government".

Voters approved this governmental change at the November 6, 2012, election with 62,469 voting for the transition and 37,368 against. Previously, Frederick County had been governed by a five-member county commission that could only legislate in local matters with the prior consent of the Maryland General Assembly. Even that authority was limited to areas authorized by the General Assembly, enabling legislation, or public local laws. As a charter county, Frederick County is now governed by a seven-member county council, with five elected from districts and two elected at-large. A popularly elected county executive is responsible for providing direction, supervision, and administrative oversight of all executive departments, agencies, and offices. The council has broad power to act on most local matters.

Jan H. Gardner was elected the first Frederick County executive in 2014 and was re-elected in 2018.

The members of the third Frederick County Council for the term beginning 2022 are:

The Frederick County state's attorney, first elected November 2, 2010, and re-elected in 2018 and 2022, is Charlie Smith, a Republican.

The sheriff of Frederick County is Republican Chuck Jenkins.

The executive director for the Frederick County Office of Economic Development is Helen Propheter. The Office of Economic Development is located at 118 North Market Street, Suite 300, Frederick, MD 21701.

Frederick County's fire and rescue service is handled by a combination career and volunteer service delivery system. The county employs over 450 career firefighters. Volunteers of the 26 volunteer fire and rescue corporations number approximately 300 active operational members. Fire, rescue and emergency medical services, including advanced life support, are handled by career staffing supplemented by volunteers. The county has a Maryland State Police Medevac located at the Frederick Municipal Airport and is designated "Trooper 3". Trooper 3 handles calls throughout the state, but provides immediate assistance to local police, fire and rescue services.

Politics
Historically a strong Republican county, Frederick County has trended more Democratic starting with the 2008 elections. No Democratic presidential candidate had won the county since Lyndon B. Johnson's 1964 landslide until Joe Biden won the county in 2020, although it just narrowly voted for Republicans John McCain in 2008, Mitt Romney in 2012 and Donald Trump in 2016. McCain edged out Barack Obama  by only 1,157 votes out of over one hundred thousand cast in the 2008 election.

|}

In state-level elections, Republicans in Frederick rebounded to more historical levels in the 2010 Maryland gubernatorial and senatorial elections, giving the Republican Ehrlich–Kane ticket 55% to Democrat O'Malley–Brown's 45. Frederick voters also supported Republican Senate challenger Eric Wargotz over incumbent Democratic Senator Barbara Mikulski by a margin of 51–46, even as Mikulski was winning statewide by a landslide 61–37. Despite its conservative reputation, Frederick County voted in favor of Maryland Question 6, which legalized same-sex marriage in Maryland. In the 2014 gubernatorial race, Republican Larry Hogan won Frederick County strongly with 63 percent of the vote compared to Democrat Anthony Brown's 35 percent. In the 2018 elections, despite increased support for Hogan, the Democrats experienced significant gains, securing a majority on the County Council and winning District 3B in the House of Delegates. The Senate election also saw incumbent U.S. Senator Ben Cardin win Frederick County with 51.7% of the vote. After Biden's win in 2020, the trend towards Democrats continued in 2022, as Democrats increased their majority on the County Council by one seat and gubernatorial candidate Wes Moore won the county with over 53% of the vote compared to 43% for Republican and Emmitsburg resident Dan Cox, the first time Frederick County voted for a Democratic gubernatorial candidate since William Donald Schaefer's landslide victory in 1986.  In the Senate election also held in 2022, incumbent Democratic Senator Chris Van Hollen won the county 55.3% to 44.6% over Republican Chris Chaffee.

Public safety
The Frederick County Sheriff's Office provides court protection, jail management and morgue operation for the entire county. It provides police patrol and detective services within the unincorporated areas of Frederick County. The entire county entails a population of 222,938 within . Frederick City, Brunswick, Mount Airy, Emmitsburg and Thurmont have municipal police departments. Middletown contracts with the Sheriff's Office for its policing.

Crime
The following table includes the number of incidents reported for each type of offense from 2012 to 2019.

Economy
The U.S. Census Bureau reported the following data for Frederick County, June 6, 2011.

According to the Maryland Department of Business and Economic Development, the following are the principal employers in Frederick County. This list excludes U.S. post offices and state and local governments, but includes public institutions of higher education.

Frederick County leads Maryland in milk production; the county's dairy herds account for one-third of the state's total. However, the dairy market is unstable, and the county, like the state more broadly, has lost dairy farms.

Communities

Cities
Brunswick
Frederick (county seat)

Towns

Burkittsville
Emmitsburg
Middletown
Mount Airy (partly in Carroll County)
Myersville
New Market
Thurmont
Walkersville
Woodsboro

Village
Rosemont

Census-designated places
The Census Bureau recognizes the following census-designated places in the county:

Adamstown
Ballenger Creek
Bartonsville
Braddock Heights
Buckeystown
Green Valley
Jefferson
Libertytown
Linganore
Monrovia
Point of Rocks
Sabillasville
Spring Ridge
Urbana

Unincorporated communities

Charlesville
Clover Hill
Creagerstown
Discovery
Garfield
Graceham
Ijamsville
Knoxville
Ladiesburg
Lewistown
Lake Linganore
Linganore
Mountaindale
Mount Pleasant
New Midway
Petersville
Rocky Ridge
Spring Garden
Sunny Side
Tuscarora
Unionville
Utica
Wolfsville

Notable people
Notable people from Frederick County include: 

Shadrach Bond, first governor of Illinois 
Barbara Fritchie, Unionist subject of 1863 Civil War poem by John Greenleaf Whittier 
Thomas Johnson, delegate to First Continental Congress and U.S. Supreme Court judge
Francis Scott Key, wrote "The Star-Spangled Banner" in 1814, which became the U.S. national anthem in 1931
Roger B. Taney, fifth U.S. Supreme Court chief justice

See also

National Register of Historic Places listings in Frederick County, Maryland

References

External links

The newspaper of record is The Frederick News-Post.
Fire Rescue Information: Frederick County Volunteer Fire Rescue Association

Frederick County Public Schools (FCPS)
Frederick County Public Libraries (FCPL)
Frederick County Tourism

Frederick County Restaurants
Frederick County Board of County Commissioners
Convention and Visitors Bureau

 
1748 establishments in Maryland
Maryland counties
Maryland counties on the Potomac River
Populated places established in 1748
Washington metropolitan area